How to Cook in Palestine (lit. "How to Cook in Eretz Israel") is a 1936 cookbook written by Dr. Erna Meyer and published by the Women's International Zionist Organization (WIZO), and is widely considered the first Jewish cookbook printed in Palestine during the British Mandate. The book urged immigrant housewives to use local ingredients including eggplant, vegetable marrow, ketchup, and olive oil that were widely available in Eretz Israel. For example, the book states: "The Palestinian housewife, whose duty is to support home industries, naturally buys Tnuva butter, but if for reasons of economy she cannot do so, why should the only alternative be to buy foreign butter or margarine when there are such excellent vegetable fats produced locally?"
Meyer also encouraged cooks to use Mediterranean herbs and Middle Eastern spices and local vegetables in their cooking. The book is generally regarded as being influential in the development of a distinctive Israeli cuisine.

References

External links
How to Cook in Palestine at Internet Archive

Cookbooks
Israeli cuisine
1936 non-fiction books